Saint-Cyran-du-Jambot is a commune in the Indre department in central France.

Saint-Cyran's origins lie with a monastic foundation founded by Saint Sigiramnus (Cyran) in the 7th century.  The foundation was first known as Saint-Pierre de Longoret (Longoretum, Lonrey) but was later named after its founder.  In the 17th century, Jean du Vergier de Hauranne, known as the Abbé de Saint-Cyran, served as abbot of this monastery.  He was succeeded by his nephew Martin de Barcos.  The monastery was dissolved in 1712.

Population

See also
Communes of the Indre department
Berry (province)

References

External links

 Ouvrage sur l'abbaye Saint Cyran

Communes of Indre